The Mineral Wells Index was a daily newspaper published in Mineral Wells, Texas, on weekday afternoons and Sunday mornings. The Index coverage area included Palo Pinto County, Texas. It is owned by Community Newspaper Holdings Inc.

Amid large revenue losses associated with the COVID-19 pandemic, it published its last issue in May 2020 and merged with sister CNHI newspaper Weatherford Democrat, located about 20 miles away.

References

External links
 Mineral Wells Index Website
 CNHI Website

Mineral Wells Index
Mineral Wells Index
1900 establishments in Texas
2000 disestablishments in Texas
Publications established in 1900